Kilnathur, also known as Kizh-arunai, is a suburb and town panchayat in Thiruvannaamalai district, Tamil Nadu, India.
It is one of the oldest settlements in North Arcot region. It developed along with Tiruvannamalai.
It spreads on the Pondicherry Road (NH 234), via Villupuram. It is the next area to Gandhinagar.

Demographics
, Kilnathur had a population of 90,000. In the 2011 census, Kilnathur had a population of 99,600.

Transport

Roads
It comes under Tiruvannamalai urban agglomerations on Pondicherry Road [via:Villupuram] NH 234. Nearly 1.5 km of Thiruvannamalai's new by-passes and its railway bridge comes under the limit of Kilnathur town panchayat.

Railways
There is one railway station for Kilnathur named "kizh-arunai" at villupuram railway route.

References

External links

Cities and towns in Tiruvannamalai district